"Stand at Your Window" is a song written by Jim Carroll and originally recorded for RCA by Jim Reeves. It was released in 1960 on his album According to My Heart and in 1961 as a single (with "What Would You Do?" from the same album on the other side). "What Would You Do?" peaked at number 15 on the Billboard country chart, and "Stand by Your Window" at number 16.

Charts

References 

1960 songs
1961 singles
Jim Reeves songs
RCA Victor singles
Songs written by Jim Reeves
Song recordings produced by Chet Atkins